Biduanita Negara Datuk Sharifah Aini binti Syed Jaafar  (2 July 1953 – 5 July 2014), better known by her stage name Sharifah Aini, was a Malaysian singer, known as Biduanita Negara or "National Songstress" after the late Salmah Ismail (Saloma). She won first place in the Radio Television Singapore (RTS) talentime contest "Bintang RTS" competition in 1968, singing "Tiga Malam". She was famously known as Kak Pah.

In Malaysia, she was one of the most enduring artistes to have recorded with the EMI Malaysia. As a tribute, her name was recorded in the Malaysian Book of Records for her contribution.

Personal life
Sharifah was born on July 2, 1953, in Nee Soon, British Malaya to a Malaysian parent. She grew up and started her singing career  in Malaysia located at Kampung Melayu Majidee, Johor Bahru.

Discography

First Era (EP) Album 
Seri Dewi Malam (EP – 1970)
Kekasih Pujaan (EP – 1970)
Aku Dan Dia (EP – 1971)
Perasaanku (EP – 1972)
Pahit Manis (EP – 1972)
Jangan Tinggalkan Daku (EP – 1972)
Adat Lama Jangan Dilupa (EP – 1973)
Inikah Manusia (EP – 1973)
Dia Terlupa (EP – 1973)
Kau Telah Disampingku (EP – 1974)
Jangan Putarkan Laguku (EP – 1974)
Sedangkan Lidah Lagi Tergigit (EP – 1974)
Permintaan Terakhir Dan Rahsia Hati (EP – 1975)
Manis Manis (EP – 1975)
Surat Dari Seberang (EP – 1977)

First Classical Era Album (1970s)
1972 – Dari Hati Ke Hati
1973 – Kenanglah Daku
1974 – Cahaya Keinsafan
1975 – Irama Cintaku
1976 – Sharifah Aini
1977 – Inilah Laguku
1977 – Forever And Ever
1978 – Inilah Laguku 2
1979 – Lela Manja
1979 – Inilah Laguku 3
1979 – Women in Love

Sensational Era Album (1980s)
1980 – Lagu-Lagu Pujaan (10 tahun – Kompilasi)
1980 – Just For You
1980 – Malam
1981 – Rasa Sayang (Feeling Of Love)
1981 – Harum Dalam Kenangan
1982 – Rahsia Hati
1982 – Collection Plus 2 (Kompilasi)
1983 – Irama Dari Sekeping Hati
1984 – Suara Kedamaian
1984 – He is Beautiful To Me
1984 – Cahayaku
1985 – Dari Masa Hingga Masa 1 Dan 2 (Kompilasi)
1985 – 16 Lagu-Lagu Terbaik Sharifah Aini (Kompilasi)
1986 – Kau Yang Bernama
1987 – The Best Of Sharifah Aini (Kompilasi)
1987 – Kasih
1988 – pilihan Sentimental Emas (Kompilasi)
1988 – Sharifah Aini

1990s album
1991 – Kenangan Manis Vol 1 (Kompilasi)
1992 – Kenangan Manis vol 2 (Kompilasi)
1993 – Koleksi Klasik (Kompilasi)
1994 – Sharifah Aini
1995 – Seraut Wajah Semerdu Suara (Album Live)
1996 – Selamanya (Kompilasi)
1996 – Pilihan Klasik Aidilfitri (Album Kompilasi Raya)
1997 – Nostalgia Aidilfitri
1998 – Yayadan
1998 – Dewi Sukma (Album Kompilasi Sharifah Aini dan Uji Rashid)
1999 – Takkan Melayu Hilang Dunia
1999 – Seri Dewi Sharifah Aini
1999 – Dari Jauh Ku Pohon Maaf (Album Kompilasi Raya)

Millennium Era album
2000 – Seribu Mawar
2000 – Dewi Intan (Inilah Laguku 1 & Inilah Laguku 2 – Terbitan semula 2 dalam 1)
2000 – Di Pintu Ampun...Menjelang Syawal (Album Raya)
2001 – Kenangan Istimewa Sharifah Aini Dan Broery Marantika (Album Khas Sharifah Aini dan Broery Marantika)
2001 – Alunan Sukma (Sharifah Aini dan Sudirman – Album Khas Trdisional Sharifah Aini dan Allahyarham Sudirman Haji Arshad)
2002 – Seri Dewi Malam: A Love Story (Album Kompilasi)
2002 – Woman In lLove (Album Kompilasi Inggeris Sharifah Aini)
2003 – Syahdu
2003 – Anugerah Datuk Sharifah Aini (Album Kompilasi)
2003 – Datuk Sharifah Aini: Syawal 1424 (Album Kompilasi Raya Datuk Sharifah Aini)
2004 – Koleksi Memori Datuk Sharifah Aini (Album Komplasi)
2005 – Memori Hit Sentimental Datuk Sharifah Aini (album Kompilasi)
2005 – Bukan Cinta Biasa
2006 – Timeless (Datuk Sharifah Aini – Album Kompilasi)

Hari Raya Albums
1973 – Selamat Hari Raya Aidilfitri
1977 – Bergembira Di Hari Raya (Menampilkan dialogue bersama Hail Amir, Uji Rashid dan Datuk D J Dave)
1984 – Deli Aidilfitri
1988 – Salam Aidilfitri
1997 – Nostalgia Aidilfitri
1999 – Dari Jauh Ku Pohon Maaf
2000 – Di Pintu Ampun...Menjelang Syawal
2003 – Datuk Sharifah Aini: Syawal 1424

Movie Soundtracks
1975 – Permintaan Terakhir
1976 – Hapuslah Air Matamu 
1980 – Sumber Ilhamku
1981 – Bintang Pujaan

Filmography

Film

Death
Sharifah Aini died on July 5, 2014, at Damansara Specialist Hospital, Damansara Utama in Selangor due to lung fibrosis at the age of 61. She was buried at the Bukit Kiara Muslim Cemetery, Kuala Lumpur.

Honours

Honours of Malaysia
  :
  Commander of the Order of Meritorious Service (PJN) – Datuk (2003)
  :
 Companion of the Order of the Crown of Johor (SMJ) (1983)

References

1953 births
2014 deaths
Malaysian people of Malay descent
Malaysian people of Arab descent
Malaysian women pop singers
Malay-language singers
People from Johor
Malaysian Muslims
Malaysian world music singers
Commanders of the Order of Meritorious Service
Companions of the Order of the Crown of Johor